Gnathoenia venerea is a species of beetle in the family Cerambycidae. It was described by Thomson in 1858. It is known from Cameroon, the Central African Republic, Angola, Gabon, and the Democratic Republic of the Congo.

Subspecies
 Gnathoenia venerea ivindoensis Breuning, 1954
 Gnathoenia venerea pangalaensis Breuning, 1954
 Gnathoenia venerea venerea Thomson, 1858

Varietas
 Gnathoenia venerea var. albomaculata Quedenfeldt, 1881

References

Ceroplesini
Beetles described in 1858